Joana Montouto Escudeiro (born 5 May 1990) is a Spanish football striker who has played for El Olivo, Zaragoza and Espanyol in Spain's Primera División.

Career

On 1 August 2007, Montouto's transfer from El Olivo to Primera División club Zaragoza was announced. The previous season, she had already rejected an offer to sign for Levante. Following her spell at Zaragoza, she would spend two seasons at Espanyol. In November 2011, after having returned to El Olivo at this point, Montouto announced her temporary retirement from the sport, citing a lack of desire and motivation. By 2018, Montouto had had three separate periods at El Olivo and two periods with Sárdoma. In that same year, she transferred to Boavista, who were playing in the Campeonato Nacional Feminino, the top tier of Portuguese football. She made 17 league appearances and scored one goal during her one season there. Montouto described that season with Boavista as the lowest point of her career. After leaving Boavista, she joined Sárdoma again for another season before transferring to UD Mos.

She has been called up to the under-19 squad for Spain. Montouto also plays futsal competitively.

Titles
 2 Spanish cups (2009, 2010)

References

1990 births
Living people
Spanish women's footballers
Primera División (women) players
RCD Espanyol Femenino players
Women's association football forwards
Zaragoza CFF players
Footballers from Vigo
Spanish women's futsal players
Campeonato Nacional de Futebol Feminino players
Spanish expatriate women's footballers
Spanish expatriate sportspeople in Portugal
Expatriate women's footballers in Portugal
Boavista F.C. (women) players